José Sagi-Vela (4 October 1944 – 20 August 1991) was a Spanish basketball player. He competed in the men's tournament at the 1968 Summer Olympics.

References

External links
 

1944 births
1991 deaths
Spanish men's basketball players
1974 FIBA World Championship players
Olympic basketball players of Spain
Basketball players at the 1968 Summer Olympics
Basketball players from Madrid